Landscape Express is a CAD software application for 2D and 3D design and drafting. It is used primarily by landscape designers. The software is developed, sold and supported by the British company 'Trial Systems Ltd' based in Burton-upon-Trent, Staffordshire. The software was first released in 2012, developed by Peter Boyce and Steven Pearce in conjunction with Anton Heymann. The software is based on the Drawing Express CAD system which utilizes tablet and pen interface. A graphics tablet, pen and overlay are used to select, use and manipulate commands thus mimicking the draughtsman's drawing board. This differs from the traditional CAD software ‘drop-down’ menu structures on-screen as the menu system is laid out in front of the user. The method of drawing in this way is aimed at being intuitive allowing the user to create and amend drawings as quickly as possible.

3D
The 3D commands for the system are modular and so the system can be used with or without them available. A 3D model can be created while displaying it in rendered mode in 'real time'. The 3D model is automatically created from the 2D plans including all walls, openings, and roof. Other information can be added to the model such as sky, landscaping, people and cars for detail. The model can be exported to POV-Ray and rendered off inside the raytracer software giving more resolution and detail.

Platforms and license types

Supported platforms
Landscape Express is Windows based software which runs on Windows 2000, XP, Vista, Windows 7 and Windows 8. The software works on 32-bit and 64-bit versions of the Windows operating system.

Landscape Express can be run on a Mac with Windows installed. This is possible on any Intel based Mac running OS X 10.5, 10.6, 10.7 or 10.8 versions of the Mac OS X operating system, through the use of VMware Fusion or Parallels Desktop- virtual machine software. Landscape Express can also be installed on a Bootcamp partition.

License types 
Landscape Express requires a USB dongle to be present on the system it is running on. This is the license for the software and without a dongle present on the system, the program will not open or save drawings.

Data interchange 
Landscape Express drawing file's use a .EXP file extension. The software can import and export DWG and DXF files amongst others. Drawings can also be saved to PDF format using any available PDF converter. Images can be imported and exported. Importing works with most mainstream image file formats.

Version history
 2013 - Landscape Express

See also
CAD
Comparison of CAD Software

References

External links
Landscape Express Webpage
Trial Systems Ltd
William Sutherland Architect, CAD - a basic guide

Computer-aided design software
Computer-aided design software for Windows
3D graphics software
2012 software